This is a list of firearm cartridges that have bullets in the  to  caliber range.

Case length refers to the round case length.
OAL refers to the overall length of the loaded round.

All measurements are given in millimeters, followed by the equivalent in inches between parentheses.

Ammunition or cartridge specification is usually the "cartridge maximum" specification and may not be the same as the nominally measured dimensions of production, remanufactured, or hand-loaded ammunition.
SAAMI and the CIP publish cartridge data.

Pistol cartridges

Revolver cartridges

Rifle cartridges

See also
 .38 caliber

References

Pistol and rifle cartridges

de:9 mm